The Shah Alam–Puchong Highway (Hicom Highway) Federal route 3214 or Shah Alam City Route BSA7 (formerly Selangor state route B7) is a major highway in Klang Valley region, Selangor, Malaysia.

It comprises Persiaran Tengku Ampuan, Persiaran Kuala Selangor, and Persiaran Klang.

List of interchanges

Highways in Malaysia

References